Wayne Girard is a Saint Lucian politician. Girard serves as the Minister in the Ministry of Finance, Economic Development and Youth Economy. He also represents the Anse la Raye-Canaries in the House of Assembly.

He was the endorsed Saint Lucia Labour Party candidate for the constituency of Anse la Raye-Canaries. Girard won the parliamentary elections after polling 51.6% of the votes to secure victory for the Saint Lucia Labour Party in the 2021 Saint Lucian General Election. The SLLP secured a landslide victory over the United Workers Party.

References

External links 

 

Members of the House of Assembly of Saint Lucia
Saint Lucia Labour Party politicians
Living people
Government ministers of Saint Lucia
Year of birth missing (living people)